Windsor Noncent (born 12 June 1984 in Clichy-la-Garenne) is a Haitian-French footballer, who currently plays for Don Bosco FC.

Early life
Noncent attended 1987 at the Ecole Les Totems and joined 1994 in the Ecole Les Tilleuls. He learned between 1997 at the Ecole Les Tilleuls and joined in the same year in the Collége Le Luzard.

Career
Noncent began his career by CS Sedan Ardennes and joined in summer 2005 to German club DJK TuS Hordel, who played a half year before sign for CSO Amnéville. After another six months left his club CSO Amnéville to sign for Levallois SC. He played in the 2006/2007 season 22 games for Levallois SC before signed in summer 2007 for Hungarian club Vác-Újbuda-Lágymányos TC from the 5. liga német.

International career
He made his debut for Haiti in on 17 April 2007 friendly match against El Salvador, in which he immediately scored a goal. He was a squad member at the 2007 Gold Cup Finals. In February 2008, he played in the friendly series against Venezuela, which served as a warm-up for the 2010 FIFA World Cup qualification match against Nicaragua or the Netherlands Antilles.

Personal life
Windsor's twin brother Ralph Noncent played currently for French club Drancy Jeanne d'Arc.

References

1984 births
Living people
Haitian footballers
French footballers
2007 CONCACAF Gold Cup players
Levallois SC players
French sportspeople of Haitian descent
CS Sedan Ardennes players
Expatriate footballers in Hungary
Sportspeople from Clichy, Hauts-de-Seine
Expatriate footballers in Germany
CSO Amnéville players
Vác FC players
Ligue Haïtienne players
Haiti international footballers
Association football defenders
Footballers from Hauts-de-Seine